Augustin Marie Morvan (7 February 1819 in Lannilis – 20 March 1897 in Douarnenez) was a French physician, politician, and writer. He is best known for treating the first recorded case of the eponymous Morvan's syndrome, a rare neurological disorder marked by acute insomnia. Morvan served as a deputy to the French National Assembly that inaugurated the Third Republic in 1871. In Brest, France, where he began his medical studies, the Rue Augustin Morvan and the Hôpital Augustin Morvan are named after him.

Sources

 whonamedit.com

1819 births
1897 deaths
People from Finistère
French republicans
Members of the National Assembly (1871)
19th-century French physicians
French medical writers
19th-century French writers
French male non-fiction writers
19th-century French male writers